Ferdi Taygan (born December 5, 1956) is a former professional tennis player from the United States. He is of Turkish descent.

Taygan enjoyed most of his tennis success while playing doubles. During his career, he won 19 doubles titles and finished runner-up an additional 19 times. Partnering Sherwood Stewart, Taygan won the 1982 French Open doubles title. He achieved a career-high doubles ranking of World No. 8.

Career finals

Doubles (19 wins, 18 losses)

Personal life
Ferdi Taygan was born in Worcester, Massachusetts to a Turkish father and a mother of Belarusian descent. His father Beyazıt immigrated to the United States to study civil engineering.

Taygan married Kay Conaway of Birmingham, Alabama in 1983. They have two daughters: Nuray, born November 18, 1984, and Shenal, born August 6, 1988.

References

References

External links
 
 

Living people
1956 births
American male tennis players
French Open champions

Sportspeople from Worcester, Massachusetts
Tennis players from Boston
UCLA Bruins men's tennis players
American people of Turkish descent
Grand Slam (tennis) champions in men's doubles